Mimlu Sen (born 1949) is an Indian author, translator, musician, composer and producer.

She was published her first book Baulsphere in 2009, and the following year it was published as The Honey Gatherers. Piers Moore Ede stated that The Honey Gatherers recounts Sen's adventures in rural Bengal.

As the life partner of Bengali baul musician Paban Das Baul, Sen collaborates with Paban on all his recordings, performing with and managing his group on their concert tours around the world. In 2002 she collaborates in a Bengali song album titled Le Chant Des Bauls - Manuche O Rautan with Paban Das Baul, Gour Khyapa and Nimai Goswami which was released by Brussels based Belgian record company Fonti Musicali.

Early life
Sen was born in Shillong, Meghalaya, India. During the 1960s and 1970s she studying in Kolkata and participating in street protests demanding an end of Vietnam War. She has been jailed for Naxalite movement.

Bibliography

Discography
 Le Chant Des Bauls - Manuche O Rautan (2002, with Paban Das Baul, Gour Khyapa & Nimai Goswami)

References

Sources

External links

1949 births
Living people
People from Shillong
Bengali musicians
Naxalite–Maoist insurgency
Women musicians from West Bengal